Jean-Paul Procureur (born 6 February 1952) is a Belgian politician and a member of the Centre démocrate humaniste. He was a member of the Belgian Senate between 2007 and 2009.

Notes

Living people
Centre démocrate humaniste politicians
Members of the Senate (Belgium)
Members of the Parliament of Wallonia
Members of the Parliament of the French Community
1952 births
21st-century Belgian politicians